Dufresny is a surname. Notable people with the surname include:

 Charles Rivière Dufresny (1648–1724), French dramatist

See also
 Dufrenoy